The International Standard Classification of Occupations (ISCO) is an International Labour Organization (ILO) classification structure for organizing information on labour and jobs. It is part of the international family of economic and social classifications of the United Nations. The current version, known as ISCO-08, was published in 2008 and is the fourth iteration, following ISCO-58, ISCO-68 and ISCO-88.

The ILO describes the purpose of the ISCO classification as:
a tool for organizing jobs into a clearly defined set of groups according to the tasks and duties undertaken in the job. It is intended for use in statistical applications and in a variety of client oriented applications. Client oriented applications include the matching of job seekers with job vacancies, the management of short or long term migration of workers between countries and the development of vocational training programmes and guidance.

The ISCO is the basis for many national occupation classifications as well as applications in specific domains such as reporting of teaching, agricultural and healthcare workforce information. The ISCO-08 revision is expected to be the standard for labour information worldwide in the coming decade, for instance as applied to incoming data from the 2010 Global Round of National Population Censuses.

The ISCO-08 structure
The ISCO-08 divides jobs into 10 major groups: 
 Managers
 Professional
 Technicians and associate professionals
 Clerical support workers
 Service and sales workers
 Skilled agricultural, forestry and fishery workers
 Craft related trades workers
 Plant and machine operators, and assemblers
 Elementary occupations
 Armed forces occupations

Each major group is further organized into sub-major, minor and unit (not shown) groups. The basic criteria used to define the system are the skill level and specialization required to competently perform the tasks and duties of the occupations.

Major group 1
Managers

11	Chief executives, senior officials and legislators
111	Legislators and senior officials
112	Managing directors and chief executives
12	Administrative and commercial managers
121	Business services and administration managers
122	Sales, marketing and development managers
13	Production and specialized services managers
131	Production managers in agriculture, forestry and fisheries
132	Manufacturing, mining, construction, and distribution managers
133	Information and communications technology service managers
134	Professional services managers
14	Hospitality, retail and other services managers
141	Hotel and restaurant managers
142	Retail and wholesale trade managers
143	Other services managers

Major group 2
Professionals

21	Science and engineering professionals
211	Physical and earth science professionals
212	Mathematicians, actuaries and statisticians
213	Life science professionals
214	Engineering professionals (excluding electrotechnology)
215	Electrotechnology engineers
216	Architects, planners, surveyors and designers
22	Health professionals
221	Medical doctors
222	Nursing and midwifery professionals
223	Traditional and complementary medicine professionals
224	Paramedical practitioners
225	Veterinarians
226	Other health professionals
227 Medical Assistant professionals
23	Teaching professionals
231	University and higher education teachers
232	Vocational education teachers
233	Secondary education teachers
234	Primary school and early childhood teachers
235	Other teaching professionals
24	Business and administration professionals
241	Finance professionals
242	Administration professionals
243	Sales, marketing and public relations professionals
25	Information and communications technology professionals
251	Software and applications developers and analysts
252	Database and network professionals
26	Legal, social and cultural professionals
261	Legal professionals
262	Librarians, archivists and curators
263	Social and religious professionals
264	Authors, journalists and linguists
265	Creative and performing artists

Major group 3
Technicians and associate professionals

31	Science and engineering associate professionals
311	Physical and engineering science technicians
312	Mining, manufacturing and construction supervisors
313	Process control technicians
314	Life science technicians and related associate professionals
315	Ship and aircraft controllers and technicians
32	Health associate professionals
321	Medical and pharmaceutical technicians
322	Nursing and midwifery associate professionals
323	Traditional and complementary medicine associate professionals
324	Veterinary technicians and assistants
325	Other health associate professionals
33	Business and administration associate professionals
331	Financial and mathematical associate professionals
332	Sales and purchasing agents and brokers
333	Business services agents
334	Administrative and specialized secretaries
335	Regulatory government associate professionals
34	Legal, social, cultural and related associate professionals
341	Legal, social and religious associate professionals
342	Sports and fitness workers
343	Artistic, cultural and culinary associate professionals
35	Information and communications technicians
351	Information and communications technology operations and user support technicians
352	Telecommunications and broadcasting technicians

Major group 4

Clerical support workers

41	General and keyboard clerks
411	General office clerks
412	Secretaries (general)
413	Keyboard operators
42	Customer services clerks
421	Tellers, money collectors and related clerks
422	Client information workers
43	Numerical and material recording clerks
431	Numerical clerks
432	Material-recording and transport clerks
44	Other clerical support workers
441	Other clerical support workers

Major group 5
Service and sales workers

51	Personal service workers
511	Travel attendants, conductors and guides
512	Cooks
513	Waiters and bartenders
514	Hairdressers, beauticians and related workers
515	Building and housekeeping supervisors
516	Other personal services workers
52	Sales workers
521	Street and market salespersons
522	Shop salespersons 
523	Cashiers and ticket clerks
524	Other sales workers
53	Personal care workers
531	Child care workers and teachers' aides
532	Personal care workers in health services
54	Protective services workers
541	Protective services workers

Major group 6
Skilled agricultural, forestry and fishery workers

61	Market-oriented skilled agricultural workers
611	Market gardeners and crop growers
612	Animal producers
613	Mixed crop and animal producers
62	Market-oriented skilled forestry, fishery and hunting workers
621	Forestry and related workers
622	Fishery workers, hunters and trappers
63	Subsistence farmers, fishers, hunters and gatherers
631	Subsistence crop farmers
632	Subsistence livestock farmers
633	Subsistence mixed crop and livestock farmers
634	Subsistence fishers, hunters, trappers and gatherers

Major group 7
Craft and related trades workers

71	Building and related trades workers, excluding electricians
711	Building frame and related trades workers
712	Building finishers and related trades workers
713	Painters, building structure cleaners and related trades workers
72	Metal, machinery and related trades workers
721	Sheet and structural metal workers, moulders and welders, and related workers
722	Blacksmiths, toolmakers and related trades workers
723	Machinery mechanics and repairers
73	Handicraft and printing workers
731	Handicraft workers
732	Printing trades workers
74	Electrical and electronic trades workers
741	Electrical equipment installers and repairers
742	Electronics and telecommunications installers and repairers
75	Food processing, wood working, garment and other craft and related trades workers
751	Food processing and related trades workers
752	Wood treaters, cabinet-makers and related trades workers
753	Garment and related trades workers
754	Other craft and related workers

Major group 8
Plant and machine operators and assemblers

81	Stationary plant and machine operators
811	Mining and mineral processing plant operators
812	Metal processing and finishing plant operators
813	Chemical and photographic products plant and machine operators
814	Rubber, plastic and paper products machine operators
815	Textile, fur and leather products machine operators
816	Food and related products machine operators
817	Wood processing and papermaking plant operators
818	Other stationary plant and machine operators
82	Assemblers
821	Assemblers
83	Drivers and mobile plant operators
831	Locomotive engine drivers and related workers
832	Car, van and motorcycle drivers
833	Heavy truck and bus drivers
834	Mobile plant operators
835	Ships' deck crews and related workers

Major group 9
Elementary occupations

91	Cleaners and helpers
911	Domestic, hotel and office cleaners and helpers
912	Vehicle, window, laundry and other hand cleaning workers
92	Agricultural, forestry and fishery labourers
921	Agricultural, forestry and fishery labourers
93	Labourers in mining, construction, manufacturing and transport
931	Mining and construction labourers
932	Manufacturing labourers
933	Transport and storage labourers
94	Food preparation assistants
941	Food preparation assistants
95	Street and related sales and service workers
951	Street and related service workers
952	Street vendors (excluding food)
96	Refuse workers and other elementary workers
961	Refuse workers
962	Other elementary workers

Major group 10
Armed forces occupations

101	Commissioned armed forces officers
1011	Commissioned armed forces officers
102	Non-commissioned armed forces officers
1021	Non-commissioned armed forces officers
103	Armed forces occupations, other ranks
1031	Armed forces occupations, other ranks

See also

 (of Canada)
 (of the United States)

References

Further reading
 Hoffmann E. 1999. International statistical comparisons of occupational and social structures: problems, possibilities and the role of ISCO-88.

External links
ISCO official website of the ILO.

Employment classifications
International Labour Organization
Lists of occupations
Occupations